Inside Climate News is a non-profit news organization, focusing on environmental journalism. The publication writes that it "covers clean energy, carbon energy, nuclear energy and environmental science—plus the territory in between where law, policy and public opinion are shaped."

Established in 2007, the Brooklyn, New York-based website covers environmental issues. In 2013 three of its staff members won a Pulitzer Prize for national reporting on the Kalamazoo River oil spill in Michigan.

History

The website was co-founded in 2007 by publisher David Sassoon and executive editor Stacy Feldman. Originally called SolveClimate News, it adopted its current name "to counter the perception that it was an environmental advocacy organization." As a non-profit journalism outlet, Inside Climate Newss model is similar to that of ProPublica and the Center for Investigative Reporting, which have similarly gained recognition. Like the other two organizations, Inside Climate News publishes its content for free on the Web, collaborates with for-profit news organizations that republish some of the nonprofit's work with credit, and aims "to tackle topics that bigger, better-known news organizations are not equipped or inclined to do."

As of February 2018, Inside Climate News had a staff of 18, including 7 full-time reporters.

Awards 
Three Inside Climate News reporters—Elizabeth McGowan, Lisa Song, and David Hasemyer—won the 2013 Pulitzer Prize for National Reporting for their series of "rigorous reports" on the Kalamazoo River oil spill in Michigan, in which an Enbridge oil pipeline spill led to the costliest onshore oil spill in American history.  The Pulitzer citation praised the reporters for exporting the aftermath of the 2010-2012 oil spill and "flawed regulation of the nation's oil pipelines, focusing on potential ecological dangers posed by diluted bitumen (or 'dilbit'), a controversial form of oil."

In April 2016, Inside Climate News was named a finalist for the Pulitzer Prize for Public Service, for the 2015 Exxon: The Road Not Taken series.  Inside Climate News was awarded a 2015 Sigma Delta Chi Award for excellence in journalism by the Society of Professional Journalists for the informational graphics in the Exxon: The Road Not Taken series, which "provide a visual timeline of Exxon's views and efforts on climate change since the 1970s, and evidence of its uncertainty campaigns in the 1990s and 2000s." The White House Correspondents Association awarded Inside Climate News a share in the 2016 Edgar A. Poe Award, which annually honors "excellence in news coverage of subjects and events of significant national or regional importance, written with fairness and objectivity," for the Exxon: The Road Not Taken series.

References

External links 
 Inside Climate News web site

American environmental websites
Pulitzer Prize for National Reporting winners
Magazines published in New York City
Magazines established in 2007
Online magazines published in the United States
Climate change organizations based in the United States